Michel "Mike" Lachance (born December 16, 1950 in St. Augustin, Quebec) is a retired harness racing driver. Widely recognized as among the best drivers of all time, his outstanding career began in 1967 in Quebec City. At retirement, he had won 10,253 races and purses totalling $187,710,149. He has been inducted into both the United States and Canadian Harness Racing Halls of Fame.

National Driving Championships and Triple Crown win
The holder of leading driver titles at major racetracks in Canada and the United States, Lachance began driving harness horses as a young boy and in 1967 began driving professionally at age seventeen in Quebec City, Quebec. He went on to win driving championships at Blue Bonnets Raceway in Montreal, Quebec. His success in Canada led to a move to the major tracks in the New York City area in 1982. In 1984 he became the first driver to win 200 races in a single year at both Roosevelt and Yonkers Raceway. In 1988 Lachance made the Meadowlands Racetrack his base. At the mecca of American harness racing he would rank in the top five drivers for fifteen straight seasons.
 
Lachance was the U.S. National Champion in wins for four straight years from 1984 to 1987. In 1986 he set a new North American record with 770 wins. On July 14, 1995, he set a new record for most wins on a single race card with eight. Among his many major career wins were five in the prestigious Little Brown Jug, four Hambletonian Stakes and three North America Cup races. In 1997 he won the Triple Crown of Harness Racing for Pacers with Western Dreamer, the only gelding of any breed to ever win a Triple Crown.

Post driving career
Retired from driving, Lachance and his wife Micheline live on their rural farm property in Millstone Township, New Jersey. Still involved as an owner of Standardbred racers, his sons Patrick and Martin have careers in harness racing.

References

1950 births
Living people
Canadian harness racing drivers
American harness racing drivers
Canadian Horse Racing Hall of Fame inductees
United States Harness Racing Hall of Fame inductees
Sportspeople from Quebec
People from Millstone Township, New Jersey